Rockin' Rhythm and Blues is an album by Jerry Lee Lewis released in 1969 on the Sun Record Company label.  It is a compilation of his early Sun Records cuts recorded with Sam Phillips in the late 1950s and early 1960s.

Track listing
"Good Golly Miss Molly" (J. Marascalo/R. Blackwell)
"Big Legged Woman" 
"Hang Up My Rock and Roll Shoes"
"Save the Last Dance for Me" (Pomus/Shuman)
"Little Queenie" (Chuck Berry)
"Johnny B. Goode" (Berry)
"Hello Josephine"
"Sweet Little Sixteen" (Berry)
"C.C. Rider" (Traditional)
"What'd I Say" (Ray Charles)
"Good Rockin' Tonight" (Roy Brown)

1969 compilation albums
Jerry Lee Lewis albums